Donald Hector  is an Australian chemical engineer and company director. He has been managing director of ASX-listed and privately owned companies.  He has a degree in chemical engineering and a PhD in engineering from the University of Sydney.

He has served on the boards of ASX-listed and privately owned companies and Newington College, and on advisory councils at the University of Sydney, the University of New South Wales, and various professional and business organisations.  From 2012, he served four years as President of the Royal Society of New South Wales, the oldest learned institution in the Southern Hemisphere, previously having been editor of its peer-reviewed journal.

Honours
 2017: Member of the Order of Australia for significant service to science in the field of chemical engineering, and to business.

References

1950 births
Living people
People educated at Newington College
Members of Newington College Council
University of Sydney alumni
Businesspeople from Sydney
Australian corporate directors
Australian chief executives
Members of the Order of Australia